Dino Falconi (September 18, 1902–February 17, 1990) was an Italian screenwriter and film director. His parents were Armando Falconi and Tina Di Lorenzo, both actors. The actor Arturo Falconi was his uncle.

Selected filmography
 The Charmer (1931)
 Television (1931)
 The Last Adventure (1932)
 One Night with You (1932)
 La segretaria per tutti (1933)
 Cardinal Lambertini (1934)
 Joe the Red (1936)
 Big Shoes (1940)
 The Taming of the Shrew (1942)
 Songs in the Streets (1950)
 Miracle in Viggiù (1951)
 Gentlemen Are Born (1960)

References

Bibliography 
 Waldman, Harry. Missing Reels: Lost Films of American and European Cinema. McFarland, 2000.

External links 
 

1902 births
1990 deaths
20th-century Italian screenwriters
Italian film directors
People from Livorno
Italian male screenwriters
20th-century Italian male writers